The men's decathlon event at the 2014 World Junior Championships in Athletics was held in Eugene, Oregon, USA, at Hayward Field on 22 and 23 July.

Medalists

Results

Final
22-23 July
Start time: 22 July  10:23  Temperature: 18 °C  Humidity: 73 %
End time: 23 July  20:24  Temperature: 17 °C  Humidity: 63 %

Participation
According to an unofficial count, 34 athletes from 23 countries participated in the event.

References

Decathlon
Combined events at the World Athletics U20 Championships